Erin Jauch (born August 24, 1994) is an American trampoline gymnast.
Jauch competed in the 2014 World Trampoline and Tumbling Championships at the Ocean Center in Daytona Beach and won the women's double-mini gold medal. Erin retired from the sport in 2016.

USTA and AAU career
Jauch also competed at competitions for both the United States Tumbling and Trampoline Association and the Amateur Athletic Union for trampoline and tumbling. Jauch was a national team member in both organizations.  At the age of 16, Jauch won the Joe Ferrell award at the AAU junior olympics. The award is to recognize the athletic ability and sportsmanship of an athlete representing each official sport at the AAU Junior Olympic Games.

Accomplishments

National
 2015 USA Gymnastics Championships, Greensboro, N.C. - 1st-DM
 2014 USA Gymnastics Championships, Louisville, Ky. - 1st-DM
 2014 U.S. Elite Challenge, Spokane, Wash. - 1st-DM
 2014 Kalon Ludvigson Invitational, Salt Lake City, Utah – 1st-DM
 2013 Stars & Stripes Cup, Daytona Beach, Fla. - 2nd-DM
 2013 U.S. T&T Championships, Kansas City, Mo. - 4th-DM
 2013 U.S. Elite Challenge, Frisco, Texas – 1st-DM
 2012 U.S. Elite Championships, Long Beach, Calif. - 1st-DM
 2012 Stars & Stripes Cup, Cleveland, Ohio – 1st-DM
 2011 U.S. Elite Championships, San Antonio, Texas – 1st-DM
 2011 U.S. Elite Challenge, Fort Worth, Texas – 3rd-DM
 2011 Winter Classic, Houston, Texas – 1st-DM
 2010 Visa Championships, Hartford, Conn. - 1st-DM (Jr. Div.)

International
 2014 World Trampoline and Tumbling Championships – 1st-DM
 2014 Pan American Championships, Toronto, Canada – 1st-DM (Team), DM
 2014 Stars & Stripes Cup, Daytona Beach, Fla. - 2nd-DM
 2013 World Championships, Sofia, Bulgaria – 1st-DM (Team); 4th-DM
 2011 World Championships, Birmingham, England – 3rd-DM (Team)
 2010 World Age Group Competition, Metz, France – 1st-DM (15-16)

References

External links
 USA Gymnastics profile

1994 births
Living people
American female trampolinists
Medalists at the Trampoline Gymnastics World Championships
21st-century American women